The Ashley House (also known as Aunt Polly's House) was a historic house located at 3159 Main Street in Fall River, Massachusetts.

Description and history 
The house was built in about 1750 in the Steep Brook section of the town, which was then still part of Freetown. It was a -story, wood-framed structure, five bays wide, with a side-gable roof and clapboard siding. It was one of the only Federal-period with a pedimented doorway that included a half-round fanlight.

It was added to the National Register of Historic Places on February 16, 1983.

The house was dismantled in July 1983, only 5 months after its designation as a landmark. The site is now owned by the New England Power Company.

See also
National Register of Historic Places listings in Fall River, Massachusetts

References

Houses in Fall River, Massachusetts
National Register of Historic Places in Fall River, Massachusetts
Demolished buildings and structures in Massachusetts
Houses on the National Register of Historic Places in Bristol County, Massachusetts
Federal architecture in Massachusetts
Houses completed in 1750